Grant Connell and Glenn Michibata were the defending champions, but lost in the quarterfinals this year.

Alex Antonitsch and Gilad Bloom won in the final 7–6, 6–1, against Kent Kinnear and Sven Salumaa.

Seeds

  Grant Connell /  Glenn Michibata (quarterfinals)
  Kent Kinnear /  Sven Salumaa (final)
  Brian Garrow /  Bryan Shelton (first round)
  Kelly Evernden /  Scott Melville (first round)

Draw

Draw

External links
Draw

Seoul Open
1991 ATP Tour
1991 Seoul Open